Rike or Ryke is a given name and a surname. It may refer to:

 Rike Boomgaarden, German singer and songwriter
 Ryke Geerd Hamer (1935–2017), German physician whose license was revoked for originating and practicing a system of pseudo-medicine 
 Kjell Kristian Rike (1944–2008), Norwegian sports commentator

See also
 Rike Kumler Co., commonly known as Rike's, a former American department store in Dayton, Ohio
 Reich, spelled  in Swedish and modern Norwegian and rige in Danish